PARKO Paliatso LUNA PARK is an amusement park in Ayia Napa. The funfair is the biggest in Cyprus built on a 30,000 square meter land. The biggest and most popular attraction is the 90-metre (300 feet) tall Sling Shot, the highest ejection seat ride in Europe.

It was established in 1999 by Vali Amusements Ltd. It is a free to enter amusement park. It covers an area of .The park has 23 different attractions. In 2010, the park acquired a 45-metre (147 feet 7.6 inches) tall Giant Wheel. 

On April 12, 2019, a boy and his mother were seriously injured at the park on the Star Flyer, when their swing collided with Looping Star, a roller coaster. The Star Flyer has since been removed from the park.

Attractions 
The rides:
 Looping Star
 Street Fighter
 Sling Shot
 Booster
 Wild Mouse
 Crazy Frog
 Musik Express
 Giant Wheel
 Air Balloon
 Caterpillar Coaster
 Adult Bumper Cars
 5D Cinema
 Carousel
 Tea Cups
 Bungee Trampolines
 Kiddy Paradise
 Mini Wheel
 Convoy
 Trampolines
 Bumper Boats
 Motorbikes
 Junior Bumper Cars

It also offers a variety of amusement arcade games and carnival games (e.g. shooting gallery, lucky games etc.).

The park has a  restaurant, a free playground area, six kiosks selling corn, hot-dogs, ice-cream, crepes, donuts etc. and two bars selling cocktails, long drinks, beers, soft drinks, slush ice, etc.

Due to its central location in Ayia Napa, a parking area is available that can host up to 300 cars.

Gallery

References

Amusement park attractions